"Hosanna/Hosaanaa" is a Tamil/Telugu/Hindi song from the 2010 Tamil film Vinnaithaandi Varuvaayaa,Telugu film Ye Maaya Chesave and 2012 Hindi film Ekk Deewana Tha composed by Academy Award winner A. R. Rahman, sung by Vijay Prakash & Suzanne D'Mello featuring Tamil lyrics by Thamarai, and the rap portion in all versions by Blaaze. The song features additional vocals by Vivek Agarwal, Dr. Narayan, V. V. Prasanna and Haricharan and chorus by K. M. Music Conservatory. In the 2012 Hindi remake of the film, Ekk Deewana Tha the song was written by Javed Akhtar sung by Leon D'Souza & Maria Roe Vincent and the interlude Hosanna humming by Suzanne D'Mello. The song became very popular in all versions and was #1 in the year end music charts of 2010.

Background
The song is woven around the word Hosanna which is considered sacred and used in liturgy by Jews and Christians. The word is a shout of adoration and literally means save now. In the movie, it is a soulful romantic song which express the joy in the heart and soul of a guy who comes across his beloved. The song has rap interludes in between by Blaaze.

The song in Tamil and Telugu starts slowly with lyrics Ee Hrudayam/Yen Idhayam, which resembles the biblical verses "If someone slaps you on one cheek, let him slap the other too!", (But in Hindi it uses a She'r "Dil hote jo mere seene mein do Doosra dil bhi main tumhe deta todne ko" which means "If there were two hearts in my chest I'd give you the second heart as well to break it.." having almost similar meaning in context of Love ) but soon gain its pace with the lines starting Entha Mandhi/Andha Neram, (But in Hindi it uses a She'r "Dilkash thi woh shaam pehle pehal Jab tumse mili thi nazar" which means "that evening was lovely when for the first time my eyes met yours.." The Tamil lyrics were written by director Gautham Vasudev Menon's usual associate Thamarai and the Telugu lyrics were written by Anantha Sreeram, whilst the lyrics for the rap portion were written by the Blaaze. It was the composer itself, who suggested to include the word Hosanna, as the heroine hails from a Christian family and to include the portion Ee Hrudayam/Yen Idhayam.

Singer Vijay Prakash is the main vocalist, who sung the male portion completely except for the rap portion starting Everybody Wanna. While Suzanne with her excellent singing, culminates in a humming of the word Hosanna. and also singer Leon D'Souza who is singing that song in the Hindi film.

Production

The song is picturised when the protagonist of the film Karthik/Sachin (In the Hindi remake of the film) (Silambarasan/Naga Chaitanya/Prateik Babbar) comes across his beloved Jessie (Trisha Krishnan/Samantha Akkineni/Amy Jackson) for the very first time. The choreography was done by Flexy Stu. The song was picturised in United States for the Telugu version, Malta for the Tamil version, and in India for the Hindi remake with an interesting dance sequence by Naga Chaitanya, Silambarasan and Pratiek Babbar in these respective films. Its Tamil version crosses 19million views and Hindi version crosses 58million views on YouTube. It was sung in those movies - Leon D'Souza, Ekk Deewana Tha, and Vijay Prakash, Blaaze (rap lyrics) from the 2010 Tamil-Telugu bilingual film, Vinnaithaandi Varuvaayaa / Ye Maaya Chesave.

Controversies 
Vinnaithaandi Varuvaayaa was one of the most anticipated soundtracks as it was Rahman's first album he composed after his double Oscars win. Following this anticipation, the track was leaked on to the internet before the official audio releases. Later the track was officially released with the same singer but another strophe had been added to the song. A thirty-second video of the song was also released later.

In 2012, members of an organization called Christian Secular Forum (CSF) objected to the song, claiming that "Hosanna" is a sacred word. They demanded removal of the word from the song, and an apology.

Reception
"Hosanna" created waves among the music lovers even before the audio release of the film. It had another grand reception when its video was released onto television channels on 11 March. The song was the most promoted song of the film and it became very popular. The song was #1 in the year end music charts of 2010, published by Sify on the number of times the songs have been played on FM channels, digital downloads and physical sales of the audio. The song is regarded as a classic by fans of the film and A.R.Rahman

Professional reviews
Indiaglitz:"The brilliant composer in A R Rahman has woven a lovable song around the word Hosanna (considered auspicious by Christians). With rap interludes in between by Blaaze, the song sticks to hearts instantly. Anantha Sreeram's lyrics describes the joy in the heart and soul of a guy who comes across his beloved. A soulful romantic number, the song with Suzanne chipping in with her best is the USP of the album."
Behindwoods:"Christian tradition defines Hosanna as the cry of adoration of the Messiahship of Jesus on his entry into Jerusalem’. Rahman has boldly adopted it to express the joy that erupts in the heart of the hero when his soul mate walks into his life. This lovely number, a mix of a few genres, is richly layered with violin, flute and many other instruments and conceived very differently too. We hear bits of Mohanam and Natabairavi notes all along. Could rock the charts."
Lordofthewebs:"This has to be the most popular song of the album. Amazing music, singing and lyrics combine to create this masterpiece that is bound to be wildly popular with the crowd. What begins as a melody with soothing music and soulful female chorus parts transitions beautifully into rap and then back to melody. Vijay Prakash has beautifully captured the mood of the song . Suzanne, with her excellent singing culminating in a mesmerizing humming has made the song better, if that is even possible. Blaaze is good with what he does, as usual."
Radioandmusic:"This track is bound to have a mass appeal with its contemporary arrangements and rap portions rendered by Blaaze. Vijay Prakash is at his best and the track starts on a melodious note with Prakash, enters the rap- hip hop mode with Blaaze and Prakash again brings back the melody bit. Suzzane D’Mello’s humming in the background makes the song even more likable."
Rediff:"On a half romantic, half mournful note, with a flute interlude begins possibly the most publicized number of the album: Hosanna by Blaaze, Vijay Prakash and Suzanne. The musical arrangement somehow takes you right back to the early days of ARR until you realize which number the refrain, Hosanna, bears a striking resemblance to: Only Time, by Enya. The rap segment closely follows the tune as well; the lyrics celebrate the lover pining away for his beloved until his world shrinks to just her. There's no denying that it's romantic what with church bells pealing, complicated violin arrangements and a chorus which all reach a crescendo in the finale. It's a pleasant listen but still seems inspired."
Kollynews:"This one is the pick of the lot for me. Nice rap number. With amazing humming and very smart singing. Tamil lyrics are too good. The componsition and the use of guitar is at a different league. The lyrics suggest that the picturization should be interesting."

See also
Ye Maaya Chesave
Vinnaithaandi Varuvaayaa
Vinnaithaandi Varuvaayaa (soundtrack)
Ye Maaya Chesave (soundtrack)
Aaromale

References

External links 
 A Sufi interpretation of the Hosanna song

2010 songs
Songs written for films
Songs with music by A. R. Rahman
Tamil film songs
Tamil-language songs
Macaronic songs
Telugu-language songs
Hindi film songs
Songs with lyrics by Javed Akhtar
Songs with lyrics by Thamarai
Vijay Prakash songs
Suzanne D'Mello songs
Telugu film songs